Telepassport Telecommunications (Cyprus) Ltd was established in April 2002 and is a private telecommunication operator offering all fixed telephone services. With the partial deregulation of the Telecommunication market in Cyprus and having secured the relevant license from the office of the Commissioner of Electronic Communications & Postal Regulation (OCECPR) the company commenced providing fixed telephone services to the Cyprus public via a technologically advanced telecommunications network.

MyNet 
MyNet is the name given to the internet packages of the company

External links
 Telepassport's homepage (archived)
 MyNet Web page (archived)

Telecommunications companies of Cyprus
2002 establishments in Cyprus
Telecommunications companies established in 2002